The 1913–14 French Rugby Championship  was contested by the winners of the regional championship of the USFSA.

AS Perpignan was the French Champion, beating Stadoceste tarbais in the final  8–7.

First round

Winner of regional championship:

 AS Perpignan (Languedoc)
 RC Toulon (Littoral)
 Stade Bordelais (Côte d'Argent) 
 RC Compiègne (Picardy)
 Le Havre (Normandy)
 Stade Nantais (Atlantique) 
 Stadoceste tarbais (Armagnac-Bigorre) 
 Périgueux (Périgord-Agenais) 
 Racing Club de France (Paris)
 Chalon (Bourgogne and Franche-Comté)
 Toulouse (Pyrénées) 
 Limoges (Limousin) 
 Bayonne (Côte Basque)
 La Rochelle Charente
 Grenoble (Alpes) 
 FC Lyon (Lyonnais)

Semifinals Pools
The eight qualified teams were divided in two pools . The first two were qualified for the final.

Poule A 
 Stadoceste tarbais
 Stade Bordelais (champion 1911)
 Le Havre AC
 Racing Club de France

Poule B 
 Perpignan
 Stade Toulousain 
 Bayonne (champion 1913)
 Grenoble
Bayonne-Perpignan 15–8
Stade Toulousain-Bayonne 5–3
Perpignan-Stade Toulousain 13–0

pool tiebreaker
Aving three time with same points, a new match between Perpignan and Bayonne was drawn. The winner was to play against Toulouse for the final.

The first match was played in March won and was tied (6–6 after two overtime of 10 minutes)

The match was repeated on April 5, and Perpignan won 3–0, and after won against Toulose 6–0

Perpignan-Bayonne 6–6 (ap. prol.), puis 3–0
Stade Toulousain-Perpignan 0–6

Final 

The Tarbes' team finished the match with 13 player after the send off of the hooker Fauré and an injury to the captain Duffour (broken bones). Despite this, they led the match 7–0 for a long time and only in the final was defeated.

Other competitions

In the final of Championship for the 2nd XV the Stade Bordelais won with Perpignan 6 – 0.

In the second division championship the Saint-Girons won against CASG 8 à 7.

Sources 
 Le Figaro, 1914
Compte rendu de la finale de 1914, sur lnr.fr
 finalesrugby.com

Notes 

1913,1914
Championship
1913–14 rugby union tournaments for clubs